The Orchestre de la Société des concerts du Conservatoire was a symphony orchestra established in Paris in 1828. It gave its first concert on 9 March 1828 with music by Beethoven, Rossini, Meifreid, Rode and Cherubini.

Administered by the philharmonic association of the Conservatoire de Paris, the orchestra consisted of professors of the Conservatoire and their pupils. It was formed by François-Antoine Habeneck in pioneering fashion, aiming to present Beethoven's symphonies, but over time it became more conservative in its programming.

Its long existence kept the tradition of playing taught at the Conservatoire prominent in French musical life. The orchestra occupied the center-stage of French musical life throughout the 19th and most of the 20th centuries. A major tour of the US took place in 1918, appearing in 52 cities. Later that year it made the first of its many recordings.

In 1967, financial difficulties, along with irregular work for the players and poor pay led to a decision by the French government to form a new orchestra. Following auditions chaired by Charles Munch, 108 musicians were chosen (of whom 50 were from the Paris Conservatoire Orchestra) for the newly created Orchestre de Paris, which gave its first concert on 14 November 1967 at the Théâtre des Champs-Élysées.

The chief conductors of the orchestra were:
François-Antoine Habeneck 1828–1848
Narcisse Girard 1848–1860
Théophile Tilmant 1860–1863
François George-Hainl 1863–1872
Édouard Deldevez 1872–1885
Jules Garcin 1885–1892
Paul Taffanel 1892–1901
Georges Marty 1901–1908
André Messager 1908–1919
Philippe Gaubert 1919–1938
Charles Munch 1938–1946
André Cluytens 1946–1960

No principal conductor was appointed during the orchestra's final years 1960–1967.

Notable premieres given by the orchestra include Berlioz's Symphonie fantastique, Saint-Saëns's Cello Concerto No. 1, and Franck's Symphony in D minor.

Notes

External links
Online version of extracts and appendices to D. Kern Holoman's definitive study The Société des Concerts du Conservatoire 1828–1967 (University of California Press, 2004).  Includes the Orchestra's complete discography and program details for all season concerts.

Organizations established in 1828
Musical groups established in the 1820s
Musical groups disestablished in 1967
French orchestras
Musical groups from Paris
History of Paris
Disbanded orchestras
Conservatoire de Paris
1828 establishments in France
1967 disestablishments in France